The 2008 United States presidential election in Minnesota took place on November 4, 2008, and was part of the 2008 United States presidential election. Voters chose ten representatives, or electors to the Electoral College, who voted for president and vice president.

Minnesota was won by Democratic nominee Barack Obama by a 10.2% margin of victory. Prior to the election, all 17 news organizations considered this a state Obama would win, or otherwise considered as a safe blue state. Barack Obama carried the state with 54.06% of the vote in 2008 over John McCain's 43.82%.  Obama became the first Democrat to win the White House without carrying Anoka County since Woodrow Wilson in 1916, as well as the first ever Democrat to win without carrying Lake of the Woods County.

In 2008 78.1% of eligible Minnesotans voted – the highest percentage of any U.S. state – versus the national average of 61.2%

As of 2020, this election was the last time Minnesota voted to the right of Pennsylvania and neighboring Wisconsin, and was decided by a double digit margin too.

Caucuses
 2008 Minnesota Democratic presidential caucuses

Campaign

Predictions
There were 16 news organizations who made state-by-state predictions of the election. Here are the last predictions before election day:

Polling

In the aftermath of the GOP National Convention that was highlighted by a well delivered and received speech by vice presidential nominee Governor Sarah Palin, a strong Obama lead tightened into a very narrow polling lead. However, when the September financial crisis irreparably damaged McCain's chances at victory, McCain remained competitive in Minnesota for some time after Obama had pulled away in other states such as Michigan and Wisconsin. At no time, however, did polls indicate that John McCain was ahead in the state, and Obama eventually did pull away from John McCain.

2008 Republican National Convention 
The 2008 Republican National Convention took place at the Xcel Energy Center in Saint Paul, Minnesota, from September 1, through September 4, 2008. The first day of the Republican Party's convention fell on Labor Day, the last day of the popular Minnesota State Fair, though because of Hurricane Gustav, this day was mostly a call for action to help victims and formal, required activities; most of the politicking and partying did not start until Tuesday, the second scheduled day

Four cities made bids to the Republican National Committee (RNC) for proposals to host the 2008 Convention. Those cities were Cleveland, Ohio; Minneapolis-Saint Paul, Minnesota; New York City, New York; and Tampa-St. Petersburg, Florida. The RNC Selection Committee made its recommendation for Minneapolis-Saint Paul and on September 27, 2006, the RNC made its decision public that the 2008 Republican National Convention would be held in Minneapolis-Saint Paul. The RNC made their decision earlier than originally scheduled because the Democratic National Committee (DNC) also had Minneapolis-Saint Paul as a finalist among bidding cities. (After the RNC's selection, the DNC removed Minneapolis-Saint Paul from consideration which left the DNC with only two cities to choose from: New York City and Denver, Colorado.) This is the second time the Minneapolis-Saint Paul area held the Republican National Convention—the first was held in 1892.

Fundraising
John McCain raised a total of $2,423,705 in the state. Barack Obama raised $6,058,168.

Advertising and visits
Obama and his interest groups $3,006,784. McCain and his interest groups spent 4,467,107. The Republican ticket visited the state 9 times. Obama visited the state only once.

Analysis
Minnesota has the longest streak as a blue state, having last voted for a Republican presidential nominee in 1972. However, the Democrats' margins of victory in 2000 and 2004 were relatively narrow. With this in mind, Republicans targeted the state for the 2008 election, holding the 2008 Republican National Convention in Minneapolis-St. Paul. Although the state swung more Democratic in 2008 and Barack Obama performed better here than John Kerry did in 2004, the swing was smaller than the national average.

During the same election, a contentious U.S. Senate battle took place between incumbent Republican U.S. Senator Norm Coleman and Democrat Al Franken. The close election resulted in two court appeals, both of which eventually declared Franken the winner. At the state level, Democrats picked up two seats in the Minnesota House of Representatives and one seat in the Minnesota Senate.

On Election Day, Obama won Minnesota by a comfortable margin, piling up 2-1 margins in Hennepin County (Minneapolis) and Ramsey County (St. Paul). Obama also ran evenly in the Minneapolis suburbs and rural Minnesota. However, McCain mostly held the same counties Bush won in the Republican base of central Minnesota. While Obama still won the state with ease, GOP efforts and the Republican National Convention led to a better Republican performance than seen in neighboring states in the Upper Midwest, and prevented the collapse of Republican support that occurred in neighboring Michigan and Wisconsin.

, this is the last election in which Stevens County, Watonwan County, Pope County, Grant County, Yellow Medicine County, Lincoln County, Pennington County, Murray County, Pine County, Big Stone County, Marshall County, Polk County, Red Lake County, and Aitkin County voted for the Democratic candidate.

Results

By county

Counties that flipped from Republican to Democratic
 Aitkin (largest city: Aitkin)
 Clay (largest city: Moorhead)
 Dakota (largest city: Hastings)
 Grant (largest city: Elbow Lake)
 Houston (largest city: La Crescent)
 Lincoln (largest city: Tyler)
 Marshall (largest city: Warren)
 Murray (largest city: Slayton)
 Olmsted (largest city: Rochester)
 Pennington (largest city: Thief River Falls)
 Polk (largest city: East Grand Forks)
 Pope (largest city: Glenwood)
 Red Lake (largest city: Red Lake Falls)
 Stevens (largest city: Morris)
 Traverse (largest city: Wheaton)
 Washington (largest city: Stillwater)
 Watonwan (largest city: St. James)
 Yellow Medicine (largest city: Granite Falls)

By congressional district
Barack Obama carried 5 of the 8 congressional districts, including one seat held by a Republican. John McCain carried three congressional districts, including one seat held by a Democrat.

Electors

Technically the voters of Minnesota heir ballots for electors: representatives to the Electoral College. Minnesota is allocated 10 electors because it has 8 congressional districts and 2 senators. All candidates who appear on the ballot or qualify to receive write-in votes must submit a list of 10 electors, who pledge to vote for their candidate and his or her running mate. Whoever wins the majority of votes in the state is awarded all 10 electoral votes. Their chosen electors then vote for president and vice president. Following an apparent mishap in the previous election, whereby an elector pledged to Democrat presidential candidate John Kerry instead cast their vote for running-mate John Edwards and thus became a faithless elector, Minnesota amended its statutes and became one of the few states whereby electors are legally required to vote for the candidate they are pledged to. This was the first election where the new laws were effective.

The electors of each state and the District of Columbia met on December 15, 2008, to cast their votes for president and vice president. The Electoral College itself never meets as one body. Instead the electors from each state and the District of Columbia met in their respective capitols.

The following were the members of the Electoral College from the state. All 10 were pledged to Barack Obama and Joe Biden:
Arthur A. Anderson
Jim Gremmels
Dave Lee
Al Patton
Joan M. Wittman
William J. Davis
Benjamin F. Gross
Matt Little
Jackie Stevenson
Susan Kay Moravec - replaced Donyta J. Wright who did not appear for the ceremony

See also
 United States presidential elections in Minnesota

References

Minnesota
2008 Minnesota elections
2008